Azemilcus ('zmlk\) was the King of Tyre during its siege by Alexander the Great in 332 BC. Alexander had already peacefully taken Byblos and Sidon, and Tyre sent envoys to Alexander agreeing to do his bidding. His response was to declare that he wished to enter the city to sacrifice to Melqart, known to Alexander as the Tyrian Herakles. Azemilcus was with the Persian fleet at the time, and the Tyrians, unsure who would win the war, responded by saying that they would obey any other command but that neither Persians nor Macedonians could enter the city. When Alexander finally captured the city, Azemilcus and various other notables, including envoys from Carthage, had taken refuge in the temple of Melqart, and Alexander spared their lives.

Azemilcus is mostly known by his coins, small 18mm silver staters featuring Melqart riding a hippocamp over the waves on one side and an owl with crook and the Phoenician letter Ayin for Azemilcus surrounded by a series of Phoenician numbers indicating the year of his reign.  There are at least 15 known years that these coins were minted between 347 BC and 332 BC, and are some of the earliest dated ancient coins that can be ascribed to a particular ruler.

He was deposed under the administration of Alexander the Great.

Notes

Kings of Tyre
4th-century BC rulers
Opponents of Alexander the Great
Rulers in the Achaemenid Empire
4th-century BC Phoenician people